The Netherlands Football League Championship 1948–1949 was contested by 66 teams participating in six divisions. The national champion would be determined by a play-off featuring the winners of the eastern, northern, two southern and two western football divisions of the Netherlands. SVV won this year's championship by beating BVV Den Bosch, AGOVV Apeldoorn, sc Heerenveen, VSV and NOAD.

New entrants
Eerste Klasse East:
Promoted from 2nd Division: HVV Hengelo
Eerste Klasse North:
Promoted from 2nd Division: LVV Friesland
Eerste Klasse South-I:
Moving in from South-II: Brabantia, Limburgia, MVV Maastricht, NAC and VVV Venlo
Eerste Klasse South-II:
Moving in from South-I: Baronie/DNL, FC Eindhoven, LONGA, Maurits and Sittardse Boys
Promoted from 2nd Division: SV Kerkrade
Eerste Klasse West-I:
Moving in from West-II: ADO Den Haag, Blauw-Wit Amsterdam, DOS, Sparta Rotterdam and Stormvogels
Promoted from 2nd Division: SVV
Eerste Klasse West-II:
Moving in from West-I: HBS Craeyenhout, Hermes DVS, SC Neptunus VSV and Zeeburgia
Promoted from 2nd Division: KFC

Divisions

Eerste Klasse East

Eerste Klasse North

Eerste Klasse South-I

Eerste Klasse South-II

Eerste Klasse West-I

Eerste Klasse West-II

Championship play-off

References
RSSSF Netherlands Football League Championships 1898-1954
RSSSF Eerste Klasse Oost
RSSSF Eerste Klasse Noord
RSSSF Eerste Klasse Zuid
RSSSF Eerste Klasse West

Neth
Netherlands Football League Championship seasons
1948–49 in Dutch football